The following is a list of squads of the countries that played in the 1983 Copa América. The first round was played in three groups of three teams with Paraguay entering directly to the semi finals as title holder.

Argentina called-up footballers playing in Argentine clubs only.

Group A

Chile 
Coach:  Luis Ibarra

Uruguay 
Head Coach:  Omar Borrás

Venezuela 

Head Coach:  Walter Roque

Group B

Argentina 
Head Coach:  Carlos Salvador Bilardo

Ecuador 
Head Coach:

Brazil 
Head Coach:  Carlos Alberto Parreira

Group C

Bolivia 
Coach:  Wilfredo Camacho

Colombia 
Head Coach:  Efraín Sánchez

Peru 
Coach: Juan José Tan

Semi-final

Paraguay 
Head Coach:

References 

Squads
1983 in sports
Copa América squads